Non-aqueous phase liquids, or NAPLs, are organic liquid contaminants that do not dissolve in, or easily mix with, water (hydrophobic), like oil, gasoline and petroleum products.

NAPLs tend to contaminate soil and groundwaters for very long period of time: they are persistent organic pollutants (POPs).  Many common groundwater contaminants such as chlorinated solvents and many petroleum products enter the subsurface in nonaqueous-phase solutions. They do not mix readily with water and therefore flow separately from ground water.

If the NAPL is denser than water, like trichloroethylene, it is called DNAPL (Dense NAPL) and will tend to sink once it reaches the water table. If it is lighter, like gasoline, it is called LNAPL (Light NAPL) and will tend to float on the water table.

See also 
 DNAPL
 LNAPL

Notes

References 
 National Research Council, 1997, Innovations in ground water and soil cleanup--From concept to commercialization: Washington, D.C., National Academies Press, 310 p.
 National Research Council, 1994, Alternatives for ground water cleanup: Washington, D.C., National Academies Press, 315 p.
 National Research Council, 1993, In situ bioremediation--When does it work?: Washington, D.C., National Academies Press, 224 p.

External links 
 Toxic Substances Hydrology Program from the USGS

Organochlorides
Water chemistry
Hydrogeology
Water pollution